China National Highway 110 (G110) runs from Beijing to Qingtongxia, via Hohhot, Baotou in Inner Mongolia, and Yinchuan.

In October 2004 and November 2004, it was overwhelmed with traffic diverted from the Jingzhang Expressway, occurring as a result of a massive traffic jam on the expressway. In a related incident in August 2010, a 100-km traffic jam occurred on this route.

In 2013, under a new 2013-2030 plan by the National Development and Reform Commission and the Ministry of Transport, the G110 has been extended to Qingtongxia.

Traffic jams

Slow moving traffic and recurrent traffic jams on Highway 110 between Beijing and Inner Mongolia result from an overload of coal trucks transporting coal from newly opened mines in Inner Mongolia to sea ports on the coast of China.

Route and distance

See also
 China National Highways

References

110
Road transport in Beijing
Transport in Ningxia
Transport in Hebei
Transport in Inner Mongolia